J. B. Clark may refer to

 John Bates Clark (1847–1938), American economist
Joseph Benwell Clark (1857–1938), English painter and engraver